Carol Brown Goldberg (born 1940) is an American artist working in a variety of media. While primarily a painter creating heavily detailed work as large as 10 feet x 10 feet, she is also known for sculpture, film, and drawing. Her work has ranged from narrative genre paintings to multi-layered abstractions to realistic portraits to intricate gardens and jungles.

Of the latter work, in 2018 Dr. Robert S. Mattison wrote, “Over the past two years, Carol Brown Goldberg has created an extraordinary body of new work: the series Entanglement. On the one hand, these complex and stunningly beautiful paintings and drawings embody Goldberg’s profound meditations on the creative process and the origins of art-making. On the other, they personify the artist’s intuitive feeling for the biological world, as well as her continuing investigations of the advanced sciences of our age. These large paintings and smaller drawings propose a procreative and fecund connectedness between nature’s forces and artistic activity.” Mattison is the Marshall R. Metzgar Professor of Art History at Lafayette College.

Carol Brown Goldberg is represented by Addison/Ripley Fine Art in Washington, DC and by C. Grimaldis Gallery in Baltimore, MD.

Early life and education
Carol Brown Goldberg was born in Baltimore, Maryland. She received a B.A. in American Studies from the University of Maryland, then moved to Washington, DC and further pursued her education at the Corcoran School of Art, where she studied at the Corcoran School of Art under Washington Color School artists Gene Davis and Tom Green. There she earned a second B.A., the equivalent of a BFA. Upon graduation in 1976, she received the Corcoran’s Eugene M. Weisz award.

Her first group exhibition was at the Washington Project for the Arts (WPA) Options Exhibition for Emerging Artists. This was soon followed by her first solo exhibition at the Osuna Gallery. CBG remained with Ramon Osuna until his passing in 2019.

Career
Carol Brown Goldberg’s work has been described as "intricate works of science and nature, windows into imagined cosmos, explosions of symbols and letters, and wobbly story book scenes," as well as "a carnival of color, form and motion, with each painting revealing different elements depending on where in the room you stand to view it."

Writes Jack Rasmussen, director and curator of the American University Museum at the Katzen Arts Center in Washington, DC, “Carol is deeply and tirelessly engaged in the pursuit of her muse. She is busy painting, sculpting, drawing, printing, photographing, filming, videotaping, and writing. Her art spans the legacy of the Washington Color School and the figurative tradition of American University, where she taught for many years. She has the hand of a Victorian engraver, the wit and pathos of Dada, and the physical gesture of Post-Impressionists and Abstract Expressionists. Throw in some Pop and Op and you still have not satisfactorily described her gifts or her influences, for she is as influenced by physicists, astronomers, neuroscientists, neurobiologists as she is by artists or movements.”

In 2018, Carol Brown Goldberg was honored by Moment Magazine as "visionary artist" alongside Ruth Bader Ginsburg and Jane Mayer as part of the Year of the Woman.

She has taught at American University and University of Maryland, was Artist in Residence at Chautauqua Institute, and is a recipient of the Maryland State Arts Award. 

She has served on the board of The Phillips Collection in Washington, DC and on the Collector’s Committee of the Reading Public Museum.

Exhibitions 
Carol Brown Goldberg's work has been the subject of multiple solo and group exhibitions at museums and galleries in the United States as well as in Paris, Berlin, Moscow, Monterrey, Mexico and Mexico City. 

In Washington, DC, CBG’s solo exhibits span from The Phillips Collection (where she was paired with Henri Matisse), to Addison/Ripley Fine Art and the Washington County Museum of Fine Art. Other solo exhibits include The Frost Art Museum in Miami, Florida, C. Grimaldis Gallery in Baltimore, MD, and on Martha’s Vineyard, MA, at the Martha’s Vineyard Playhouse, Chilmark Public Library, and Featherstone Center for the Arts.

From 2014-2016 her paintings and sculpture were on tour, appearing in the Vero Beach Museum of Art, Vero Beach, FL, the Foosaner Art Museum in Melbourne, FL, the South Dakota Art Museum in Brookings, SD, and the Lake Charles Cultural Center in Lake Charles, LA. In 2021 she was chosen to be one of 12 Mid-Atlantic women abstract artists in the exhibition Fields and Formations, organized by Kristen Hileman.

In addition to the museums and institutions holding her work (listed below), CBG's sculptures are part of permanent outdoor exhibits at Reading Public Museum in Reading, PA; Johns Hopkins University Hospital in Baltimore, MD; The Chautauqua Institute in Chautauqua, NY; Montclair State University in Montclair, NJ; in DC at American University; George Washington University, the Kreeger Museum, and Martha’s Table; and in Spain at the Medina del Campo Sculpture Park.

Projects 
Special projects include a work celebrating the Black Student Fund's 25th anniversary in 1989, The Poetry of Justice for Amnesty International’s Human Rights Day in 1990, and in 1996, Solar Night for the Bosnian Human Rights Group of Oxford, England to encourage women’s entrepreneurship in Bosnia. 

Additional notable projects include the 38-foot photographic mural on permanent display at the Katzen Arts Center at American University; Washington, DC in 2016, called “The Studio: A Place of Transformation, and a 22 x 6-foot wall mural in collaboration with students, faculty, and staff at Florida International University in 2017.

CBG produced two movies exploring the relationship between art and memory, the 1993 film, Concertina, which received the AMANA Award, and the 2013 11-minute film, The Color of Time. See below for recognition.

Connecting Art and Science 
In the late 1980s, CBG began examining the relationships between art and science, leading to a 14-part lecture series, “Voices of Our Time,” CBG produced and curated in 1990 and 91 at the Strathmore Hall Arts Center in Bethesda, MD. Expanding on this relationship, her work has been exhibited at the American Center for Physics, and other science related institutions.  Science is often reflected in her work and are included in her lectures and talks.

In 2012, she and neuroscientist Dr. Partha Mitra, participated in Fré Ilgen's panel discussion, Checkpoint Ilgen #9, in Berlin, Germany, focused on creativity and the brain.

This focus continues to illuminate CBG’s work, as art critic and poet Donald Kuspit writes in an International Arts and Artists’ volume on the artist. “Goldberg’s new abstract paintings are scientifically grounded, indicating that spiritual consciousness is not a groping toward the unknown—blindly mystical as it were—but enlightened cognition of scientifically known reality. If science is mysticism satisfied—what seems beyond comprehension made comprehensible—then Goldberg’s abstract paintings show that the seemingly mystical, incomprehensible implicate order is scientifically comprehensible.”

Awards and Honors 

 2020   “Distinguished Terrapin Award,” The University of Maryland College of Arts and Humanities; College Park, MD
 2019   “Transformer 16th Annual Silent Auction,” Corcoran School of Art and Design; Washington, DC
 2019   “Daryl Reich Rubenstein Award,” Sidwell Friends School; Washington, DC
 2018    “Year of the Woman” Gala Honoree, Moment Magazine; Washington, DC
 2016   Juror’s Award, “Making Sense: See, Smell, Hear, Taste, Touch,” McLean Project for the Arts; McLean, VA
 2014   The Color of Time film presented in short film festivals in Hudson Valley, and Warwick, NY as well as ShortD3:F9 Film Selection, YouTube
 2013   Third Prize; International Sculpture Competition; Parque de Levante; Murcia, Spain
 2013   FilmColumbia 2013; The Color of Time
 2012   Best Experimental Film; London Film Awards; The Color of Time
 2012   Award of Excellence, La Jolla Short Film Festival; Best Shorts Competition; The Color of Time
 2010   Maryland State Arts Council: Individual Artist Award; Baltimore, MD
 1994   AMANA Award; “Concertina”; video
 1987   Outdoor Sculpture Honorariums: City of Rockville; Rockville, MD and  Martin Luther King Park; Montgomery County, MD
 1976    Eugene M. Weisz Memorial Award; Corcoran School of Art; Washington, DC

Selected Collections 

 National Museum of Women in the Arts; Washington, DC
 George Washington University; Washington, DC
 American University; Washington, DC
 The Kreeger Museum; Washington, DC
 The Gabarrón Foundation Museum; Valladolid, Spain
 National Institutes of Health; Bethesda, MD
 Amnesty International; Washington, DC
 University of Maryland; College Park, MD
 New Orleans Museum of Art; New Orleans, Louisiana
 The Frances Lehman Loeb Art Center; Vassar College; Poughkeepsie, NY
 Fannie Mae Organization; Washington, D
 Art in Embassy Program
 DC Commission on the Arts and Humanities; Art Bank 2006, 2009; Washington, DC
 South Dakota Art Museum; Brookings, SD
 Vero Beach Museum of Art; Vero Beach, FL
 ArtBank; Washington, DC
 Reading Public Museum; Reading, PA
 Academy Art Museum; Easton, MD
 The Suzanne H. Arnold Gallery; Lebanon Valley College; Annville, PA
 Museum of Arts and Sciences; Daytona Beach, FL
 Deland Museum of Art; Deland, FL
 Foosaner Art Museum (formerly Brevard Art Center and Museum); Melbourne, FL
 Museum of the University of Central Florida; Orlando, FL

Selected Solo Exhibitions 

 2022                “…On the Other Hand”at The Chilmark Library; Washington, D.C.
 2021                “…On the Other Hand” Addison/Ripley Fine Art; Washington, D.C.
 2020                “Entanglement” C. Grimaldis Gallery, Baltimore, MD
 2019                “Mirror Universe” Martha’s Vineyard Playhouse; Vineyard Haven, MA
 2019                “Summer Selections” Addison/Ripley Fine Art; Washington, DC.
 2018                “Carol Brown Goldberg: Recent Works” Mirror Universe: Recent Works by Carol Brown GoldbergHagerstown, MD
 2018                “Carol Brown Goldberg: Extravagant Eden” Chilmark Public Library; Chilmark, MA
 2018                “Carol Brown Goldberg: Entanglement” Featherstone Center for the Arts; Oak Bluffs, MA
 2018                “Entanglement” Katzen Arts Center at American University; Washington, DC
 2018                “Carol Brown Goldberg: Recent Works” Katzen Arts Center at American University; Washington, DC
 2017                “Tangled Nature” Frost Art Museum; Miami, FL
 2016                “Extravagant Edens” Addison Ripley Fine Art; Washington, DC
 2016                “Carol Brown Goldberg: Recent Works” Lake Charles Cultural Center, Lake Charles, LA
 2015                “Carol Brown Goldberg” A Gallery; Oak Bluffs, MA
 2015                “One on One: Carol Brown Goldberg/ Henri Matisse” The Phillips Collection: curator, Klaus Ottmann; Washington, DC
 2015                “Carol Brown Goldberg: Recent Works” South Dakota Art Museum; Brookings, SD
 2015                “Carol Brown Goldberg: The Color of Time” Denise Bibro Fine Art, New York, NY
 2014                “Carol Brown Goldberg: Recent Works” Vero Beach Museum of Art; Vero Beach, FL
 2014                “Carol Brown Goldberg: Recent Sculpture” Foosaner Art Museum; Melbourne, FL
 2014                “Carol Brown Goldberg: Sculpture” Cosmos Club; Washington, DC
 2013                “The Circle of Time” Reading Public Museum; Reading, PA
 2013                “Color in Space” David Richard Gallery; Sante Fe, NM
 2012                Art Santa Fe; Osuna Art; Santa Fe, NM
 2012                Katzen Art Center at American University; Washington, DC
 2012                “Flow and Fluctuation” American Center for Physics; College Park, MD
 2012                “Abstract Realities” The Gabarrón Foundation, New York, NY
 2012                “Sculpture and Works on Paper” Luther Brady Gallery, George Washington University; Washington, DC;
 2011 & 2012    Addison/Ripley Fine Art; Washington, DC
 2011                “Painting and Sculpture” George Segal Gallery, Montclair State University; Montclair, NJ
 2010                Fundación Sebastian A.C.; Mexico City, Mexico
 2010                The Suzanne H. Arnold Gallery; Lebanon Valley College; Annville, PA
 2010                Galería Emma Molina; Monterrey, Mexico
 2009                Centro de las Artes CONARTE Museum; Monterrey, Mexico
 2009                Osuna Gallery; Washington, DC
 2009                Casa de Vacas, Buen Retiro Park; Madrid, Spain
 2009                Sala de Exposiciones Molinos de Río; Murcia, Spain
 2008                The Gabarrón Foundation Museum; Valladolid, Spain
 2008                The National Arts Club (Gramercy Park); New York, NY
 2007                Osuna Gallery; Washington, DC
 2007                American University, Katzen Arts Center; Washington, DC
 2006                Pyramid Atlantic Gallery; Silver Spring, MD
 2005                Art Santa Fe; Osuna Art; Santa Fe, NM
 2005                Osuna Art; Washington, DC
 2004                Cosmos Club; Washington, DC
 2003                The John and Esther Clay Fine Arts Gallery; Cheyenne, WY
 2002                Chautauqua Institute; Chautauqua, NY
 2002                Anton Gallery; Washington, DC
 2000                Cosmos Club; Washington, DC
 1996                Compass Bank; Chilmark, MA
 1995                APA; Washington, DC
 1995                Troyer Fitzpatrick Lassman Gallery; Washington, DC
 1995                Art Santa Fe; Osuna Gallery; Santa Fe, NM
 1993                “Concertina” (Multi-Media); Maryland Art Place, Baltimore, MD
 1992                Osuna Gallery; Washington, DC
 1990                Amnesty International; Peat Marwick Main & Company; Washington, DC
 1987  -1990     Osuna Gallery; Washington, DC
 1987                Virginia Polytechnic Institute; Squires Gallery; Blacksburg, VA
 1986                Strathmore Hall Arts Center; Rockville, MD
 1986                Osuna Gallery; Washington, DC
 1985                The G. Sander Gallery; Daytona Beach, FL
 1983                FIAC Grand Palais; Osuna Gallery; Paris, France
 1982                Washington Hebrew Congregation; Washington, D C
 1982                Osuna Gallery; Washington, DC

Selected Group Exhibitions 

 2022    Art Miami, C. Grimaldis Gallery
 2022    Summer ’22 exhibition at C. Grimaldis Gallery; Baltimore, MD/td>
 2022    Fields and Formations at The Delaware Contemporary / AU Katzen
 2021    Objects from the Studio: The Sculptor’s Process at The Kreeger Museum; Washington, DC
 2021    Pink Rings on view in the exhibition Fleeting, Fled at Glen Echo Park; Glen Echo, MD
 2021    “The Long Sixties” Katzen Arts Center at American University; Washington, DC
 2021    “Fleeting, Fled” Glen Echo Park; Glen Echo, MD
 2020    ARTINA 2020: LIGHT: A Sculptural Solar Dance exhibition at Sandy Spring Museum; Sandy Spring, MD
 2020    “Women and Nature” Maryland State Arts Council Virtual Juried Exhibition
 2020    “Summer ’20,” C. Grimaldis Gallery; Baltimore, MD
 2020    ARTINA 2020, “LIGHT: A Sculptural Solar Dance,” Sandy Spring Museum; Sandy Spring, MD
 2020    “Celebrating 100 Years of Women Artists,” Washington County Museum of Fine Arts; Hagerstown, MD
 2020    “Objects from the Studio: The Sculptor’s Process,” The Kreeger Museum; Washington, DC
 2019    “The Feminine Sublime,” Georges Berges Gallery; New York, NY Curated by Donald Kuspit
 2018    “Recollection: Celebrating 15 Years of Exhibitions at BlackRock Center for the Arts” BlackRock Center for the Arts; Germantown, MD
 2018    “Full Circle: Hue and Saturation in the Washington Color Schoo,” The Luther W. Brady Art Gallery at George Washington University; DC
 2018    “Another Dimension,” Nano Gallery at the District of Columbia Arts Center; curators, Philip Barlow and Chandi Kelley; Washington, DC
 2017    “Being Sentient/Sentient Being.” 18th Annual Wills Creek Exhibition at Allegany Arts Council; juror, Aneta Georgievksa-Shine; Cumberland, MD
 2017    “Drawn From: 15 Years of Exhibitions at the Luther W. Brady Art Gallery” The Luther W. Brady Art Gallery at George Washington University; DC
 2016    “MAP 35th Anniversary Exhibition” Maryland Art Place, Baltimore, MD.
 2016    “Making Sense: See, Smell, Hear, Taste, Touch,” McLean Project for the Arts; juror, Nora Atkinson; McLean, VA.
 2015    “Micro-Monuments” from the Washington Sculptors Grou, Salzlandmuseum; Schönebeck, Germany and the Center for Hellenic Studies; DC.
 2015    “Rain or Shine: Art in Nature, Nature in Ar,” The Luther W. Brady Art Gallery at George Washington University; Washington, DC
 2015    “Cosmos at the Cosmos,” The Cosmos Club; curator, Lenore Miller: Washington, DC
 2014    “Sculpture Now 2014 – 30th Anniversary, Wash. Sculptors Group” Katzen Arts Center at American University, curator: Jack Rasmussen; DC
 2014    “Survival” Cosmos Club, Washington, Dc
 2014    “Washington Color Abstraction” The Gabarron Foundation; curator, Donald Kuspit; New York, NY
 2013    “Washington Art Matters” Katzen Arts Center at American University; Washington, DC
 2013 & ’15    “Alchemical Vessels” Smith Center for Healing and the Arts; Washington, DC
 2012    “Signals” DC Arts Center; curator: J.W. Mahoney; Washington, DC
 2012-’13    “Fall for the Arts” Katzen Arts Center at American University; Washington, DC
 2012    “Select 2012” Washington Project for the Arts; Washington, DC
 2011    National Museum of Women in the Arts; Washington, DC
 2011    “Catalyst” Washington Project for the Arts, American University; curator: J.W. Mahoney; Washington, DC
 2010    Juried “Call for Artists Show” BlackRock Center for the Arts; Germantown, MD
 2010    “Gaps” Greater Reston Art Center; curator: Vesela Sretenovic, Reston, VA
 2010    “Cream” Washington Project for the Arts; curator: Mera Rubbell, The American University; Washington, DC
 2008    “Personal Geometry” Emerson Gallery; Mclean, VA
 2007    “Washington Women in the Arts: A Selection” Osuna Gallery; Washington, DC
 2006    “On the Verge" American Center for Physics; College Park, MD
 2006    “Pulse 2006” Hillyer Art Space; Washington, DC
 2005    “Faces of the Fallen” Women’s Military Museum; Arlington, VA
 2002-’04    Chautauqua Institute; Chautauqua, NY
 2002    “Math=Art” Frostburg College; Frostburg, MD
 2001-’02    Anton Gallery; Washington, DC
 2000    American University; Vaughn Associate; New York, NY
 1999    “International Visions” Artists for Amnesty International; Washington, DC
 1999    Emerson Gallery; McLean, VA
 1997    “Flowers” Osuna Gallery; Washington, DC
 1997    Maryland Art Place; Baltimore, MD
 1995    “Three Visions” Washington Project for the Arts; Washington, DC
 1995    “Artist to Artist” Rock Creek Gallery; Washington, DC
 1995    AFTA: Embassy of Federal Republic of Germany; Washington, DC
 1995    “Collaboration at its Best” George Mason University; Fairfax, VA
 1995    “Portraits” George Washington University; Washington, DC
 1995    “Prints 1995” Baltimore Museum of Art; Baltimore, MD
 1984-’94    Auction; Washington Project for the Arts; Washington, DC
 1994    A New Nature” Emerson Gallery; McLean, VA
 1993    “NNDG” Emerson Gallery; McLean, VA
 1992    St. John’s College; Collegeville, MN
 1992    “Alumni” Corcoran Gallery of Art; Washington, DC
 1992    “WPA Show” Corcoran Gallery of Art; Washington, DC
 1991    “The Critic’s Choice” Watkins Gallery, The American University; Washington, DC
 1991    “Collector’s Favorites” RAP; Rockville, MD
 1991    “Washington Print Show” Brody Gallery/Gallery K; Washington, DC
 1990    “Moscow/Washington, DC Exchange” Moscow, USSR
 1990    “Art Against Aids” Washington Projects Arts; Washington, DC
 1990    “Metaphoric Messages” Strathmore Hall Arts Center; Rockville, MD
 1990    Rockville Arts Place; Rockville, MD
 1988    “Four Sculptors” Washington Square; Washington, DC
 1987    “Paintings and Sculptures” Osuna Gallery; Washington, DC
 1987    “Figurative Show” Washington Square; Washington, DC
 1986    Driscoll Gallery; Denver, CO
 1986    “Art and Function” Painted sculpture; Washington Square; Washington, DC
 1986    “Select Sculpture” G. Sander Fine Art Gallery; Daytona Beach, FL
 1986    “Disquieting Figure” Osuna Gallery; Washington, DC
 1986    “Garden of Earthly Delights” Gallery Ten; Washington, DC
 1985    “Artists’ Self Portrait” Jane Haslem Gallery; Washington, DC
 1985    “The Washington Show” Corcoran Gallery of Art; Washington, DC
 1984    “Washington Galleries” Strathmore Hall Arts Center; Washington, DC
 1982    “Summer Exhibit” Osuna Gallery; Washington, DC
 1981    “Hanover Place” Osuna Gallery; Washington, DC
 1981    “OPTIONS ’81” Washington Project for the Arts; Washington, DC
 1977    “Summertime” Pyramid Gallery; Washington, DC
 1976    “Summer Exhibit” Pyramid Gallery; Washington, DC

References

External links and Selected Media
Carol Brown Goldberg: Recent Works
Carol Brown Goldberg
Sitting in Uncertainty: Fields and Formations at the Katzen Arts Center: https://bmoreart.com/2022/05/sitting-in-uncertainty.html
https://www.washingtonpost.com/arts-entertainment/2022/03/02/american-university-museum-positive-fragmentation-fields-and-formations/
https://www.theartblog.org/2021/12/powerful-show-of-art-by-women-and-non-binary-artists-working-in-the-region-today-at-the-delaware-contemporary/
https://www.washingtonpost.com/entertainment/museums/art-gallery-shows-dc-region/2021/05/06/659ee1aa-ac4e-11eb-ab4c-986555a1c511_story.html
Interview: https://sites.google.com/terpmail.umd.edu/umd-art-history-museum-world/artists/carol-brown-goldberg?authuser=0&pli=1
https://www.mvtimes.com/2018/08/15/carol-brown-goldberg-unearths-world-foliage/ 
Donald Kuspit on Entanglements: https://whitehotmagazine.com/articles/brown-goldberg-s-entanglement-series/3942
https://vineyardgazette.com/news/2017/08/03/finding-herself-through-art-guided-intuition
https://www.artfixdaily.com/artwire/release/7123-frost-museum-exhibition-explores-the-metaphysical-relationship-be
https://www.sciartmagazine.com/blog/review-tangled-nature-at-the-frost-art-museum
https://newsarchives.fiu.edu/2017/03/frost-super-murals-a-collaboration-of-hundreds
https://gwtoday.gwu.edu/artist-creates-outdoor-sculpture-university
https://patch.com/new-jersey/montclair/the-cosmic-everyday-carol-brown-goldberg-painting-sculpture
https://vlex.com.mx/vid/guadalupe-loaeza-caos-belleza-80694843
https://www.abc.es/espana/madrid/abci-opcion-bello-200908080300-923177295158_noticia.html
https://www.elnortedecastilla.es/20081008/cultura/orden-musical-20081008.html
https://www.washingtonpost.com/archive/lifestyle/1992/02/08/galleries/4a463fcd-fe07-42b6-972d-34f3ece03f30/?utm_term=.c12974390edd
https://www.washingtonpost.com/archive/lifestyle/1982/04/29/carol-goldberg-outlines/f11d3f47-fb19-4c94-8fc4-d1a349d8518b/?utm_term=.787a435e61e1

Living people
20th-century American women artists
Painters from Washington, D.C.
University of Maryland, Baltimore alumni
Artists from Washington, D.C.
Artists from Maryland
21st-century American women
1940 births